also Mount Kita Yoko, is an active lava dome located in the Northern Yatsugatake Volcanic Group of the Yatsugatake Mountains, Honshū, Japan. Mount Yoko has shown the most recent activity and is now considered an active volcano. It last erupted about 800 years ago. The eruption consisted of ash with a lava flow of some 3 million cubic meters. The eruption was dated by corrected radiocarbon dating. The next previous eruption was in or after 400 BCE.

References

 Geographical Survey Institute

Yoko
Yoko
Yoko
Yoko